The Greenwood River is a tributary of the Brule River of Minnesota in the United States. It rises at the outlet of Greenwood Lake and flows south  to the Brule River.

It was formerly called Diarrhea River, because it was supposed drinking its water caused diarrhea.

There are both brook trout and smallmouth bass present in the Greenwood River.

See also
List of rivers of Minnesota

References

Minnesota Watersheds
USGS Hydrologic Unit Map - State of Minnesota (1974)

Rivers of Minnesota
Rivers of Cook County, Minnesota